Lewthwaite is a surname. Notable people with the surname include:

Jimmy Lewthwaite (1920–2006), English rugby league player
John Lewthwaite (1816–1892), New Zealand politician
Paul Lewthwaite (born 1969), British sculptor
Samantha Lewthwaite (born 1983), British jihadist
William Lewthwaite